"That's All You Gotta Do" is a song written by Jerry Reed and performed by Brenda Lee.  The song reached #6 on the Billboard Hot 100 and #19 on the R&B chart in 1960.  The song also reached #6 in Australia.  The song was featured on her 1960 album, Brenda Lee.

The song was ranked #71 on Billboard magazine's Top Hot 100 songs of 1960.

References

1960 songs
1960 singles
Songs written by Jerry Reed
Brenda Lee songs
Decca Records singles